Bachhu Mollah is a Bangladesh Nationalist Party politician and a former Jatiya Sangsad member representing the Kushtia-1 constituency.

Career
Mollah was elected to parliament from Kushtia-1 as a Bangladesh Nationalist Party candidate in March 2004 in a by-election, following the death of the incumbent, Ahsanul Haq Mollah, who was also his father.

Mollah protected smugglers in Kushtia District. He laid seize to a unit of Bangladesh Rifles to force them to release a drug smuggler they had caught. He was sued in 2007 for attacking and looting houses after Bangladesh Nationalist Party came to power in 2001.

References

Living people
Bangladesh Nationalist Party politicians
People from Kushtia District
8th Jatiya Sangsad members
Year of birth missing (living people)
Place of birth missing (living people)